Jagat Prakasha Malla (Nepal Bhasa:)  or Jagat Prakash Mallaw was a Malla Dynasty King of Bhaktapur, Nepal from 1644 to 1673. He succeeded his father Naresha Malla (Narendra) and became known as a great builder.

References

Malla rulers of Bhaktapur
1673 deaths
Year of birth unknown
People from Bhaktapur
17th-century Nepalese people